Babynino is a rural locality (a settlement) and the administrative center of Babyninsky District of Kaluga Oblast, Russia. Population:

References

Notes

Sources

Rural localities in Kaluga Oblast